Wilkin County is a county in the U.S. state of Minnesota. As of the 2020 census, the population of Wilkin County was 6,506. Its county seat is Breckenridge. The county is named for Colonel Alexander Wilkin, a lawyer who served as Minnesota's U.S. marshal and was later killed in the Civil War.

Wilkin County is part of the Wahpeton, ND–MN Micropolitan Statistical Area, which is included in the Fargo-Wahpeton, ND-MN Combined Statistical Area.

History
In 1849, the newly organized Minnesota Territory legislature authorized the creation of nine large counties across the territory. One of those, Pembina (later renamed as Kittson), contained areas that were partitioned off on 8 March 1858 to create Toombs County, named after Robert Toombs (1810–85) of Georgia. Toombs had been a member of the US House of Representatives (1845-1853), and US Senate (1853-1861). He became the Confederate secretary of state in 1861; this disloyalty to the Union displeased county residents, who petitioned for a name change. Accordingly, in 1863, the county was renamed Andy Johnson County for  Andrew Johnson, who was serving as the military governor of Tennessee at the time. However, Johnson's actions and positions as US President (1865-1869) also displeased county residents, so on 6 March 1868 the county name was again changed, to Wilkin County. It was named for Colonel Alexander Wilkin, a Minnesota attorney and secretary to the Minnesota Territory governor.

The future Breckenridge, Minnesota was settled beginning in the 1850s, and a town was platted there in the spring of 1857. Thus when Toombs County was authorized in 1858, Breckenridge was listed as the county seat. It continued as the county seat through the subsequent county name changes.

Geography

Wilkin County lies on the west side of Minnesota. Its west border abuts the east border of the state of North Dakota (across a river). The Bois de Sioux River flows northward along the county's west border. The Rabbit River flows westward through the lower part of the county and discharges into the Bois de Sioux on the county's lower west border. The Otter Tail River flows west-northwestward through the central part of the county and merges with the Bois de Sioux at Breckenridge to form the Red River, which continues to flow along the county's west line northward toward the Hudson Bay in Canada.

Wilkin County terrain consists of low rolling hills, completely devoted to agriculture. The terrain slopes to the west and north, with its highest point on the upper east border at 1,250' (381m) ASL.

Major highways

  Interstate 94
  U.S. Highway 52
  U.S. Highway 75
  Minnesota State Highway 9
  Minnesota State Highway 55
  Minnesota State Highway 108
  Minnesota State Highway 210

Adjacent counties

 Clay County - north
 Otter Tail County - east
 Grant County - southeast
 Traverse County - south
 Richland County, North Dakota - west

Protected areas

 Akron State Wildlife Management Area
 Atherton State Wildlife Management Area
 Richard M. and Mathilde Rice Elliot Scientific and Natural Area
 Rothsay State Wildlife Management Area
 Sunnyside Township State Game Refuge
 Western Prairie Scientific and Natural Area

Lakes
 Breckenridge Lake - formed by a dam on the Otter Tail River in Breckenridge Township

Demographics

2000 census
As of the 2000 census, there were 7,138 people, 2,752 households, and 1,926 families in the county. The population density was 9.50/sqmi (3.67/km2). There were 3,105 housing units at an average density of 4.13/sqmi (1.60/km2). The racial makeup of the county was 97.77% White, 0.15% Black or African American, 0.42% Native American, 0.15% Asian, 0.01% Pacific Islander, 0.49% from other races, and 0.99% from two or more races. 1.54% of the population were Hispanic or Latino of any race. 41.8% were of German and 29.2% Norwegian ancestry.

There were 2,752 households, out of which 35.2% had children under the age of 18 living with them, 59.5% were married couples living together, 7.0% had a female householder with no husband present, and 30.0% were non-families. 25.9% of all households were made up of individuals, and 13.40% had someone living alone who was 65 years of age or older. The average household size was 2.54 and the average family size was 3.09.

The county population contained 27.8% under the age of 18, 7.0% from 18 to 24, 27.7% from 25 to 44, 21.5% from 45 to 64, and 16.1% who were 65 years of age or older. The median age was 38 years. For every 100 females there were 95.3 males. For every 100 females age 18 and over, there were 96.1 males.

The median income for a household in the county was $38,093, and the median income for a family was $46,220. Males had a median income of $31,273 versus $20,925 for females. The per capita income for the county was $16,873. About 6.2% of families and 8.1% of the population were below the poverty line, including 8.9% of those under age 18 and 8.3% of those age 65 or over.

2020 Census

Communities

Cities

 Breckenridge (county seat)
 Campbell
 Doran
 Foxhome
 Kent
 Nashua
 Rothsay (part)
 Wolverton

Unincorporated communities

 Brushvale
 Childs
 Everdell
 Lawndale
 McCauleyville
 Tenney

Townships

 Akron
 Andrea
 Atherton
 Bradford
 Brandrup
 Breckenridge
 Campbell
 Champion
 Connelly
 Deerhorn
 Foxhome
 Manston
 McCauleyville
 Meadows
 Mitchell
 Nilsen
 Nordick
 Prairie View
 Roberts
 Sunnyside
 Tanberg
 Wolverton

Politics
Wilkin County voters have traditionally voted Republican. In no national election since 1976 has the county selected the Democratic Party candidate (as of 2020).

See also
 National Register of Historic Places listings in Wilkin County, Minnesota

References

External links
Wilkin County government’s website

 
Minnesota counties
Wahpeton micropolitan area
1868 establishments in Minnesota
Populated places established in 1868